Zouan-Hounien is a town in the far west of Ivory Coast. It is a sub-prefecture of and the seat of Zouan-Hounien Department in Tonkpi Region, Montagnes District. Zouan-Hounien is also a commune.

In 2021, the population of the sub-prefecture of Zouan-Hounien was 111,099.

Villages
The fifty one villages of the sub-prefecture of Zouan-Hounien and their population in 2014 are:

Notes

Sub-prefectures of Tonkpi
Communes of Tonkpi